The black-spotted ridge-tailed monitor (Varanus insulanicus baritji), also called commonly the black-spotted spiny-tailed monitor, the lemon-throated monitor, the northern ridge-tailed monitor, Whites monitor, and the yellow-throated monitor, is a subspecies of lizard in the family Varanidae. The subspecies is native to Australia's tropical Northern Territory. It is listed as Least Concern on the IUCN Red List as it is considered common and not threatened. It was first described in 1987. It is also known as White's dwarf goanna.

Etymology
The subspecific name, baritji, is an Australian aboriginal word for white, in honour of Australian biological anthropologist Neville White who discovered the species.

Habitat
The preferred natural habitat of V. insulanicus baritji is rocky areas.

Description
V. insulanicus baritji has a spiny tail, and is similar in appearance to Varanus acanthurus, but differs in colour pattern. For example, V. baritji has a bright-yellow underside, but lacks the light and dark dorsal neck stripes and the light ocellated markings on its back for which V. acanthurus is known.

Reproduction
V. insulanicus baritji is oviparous.

References

External links
Varanus baritji at Kingsnake.com

Further reading
Bennet DF (2003). "Australische Warane". Reptilia (Münster) 8 (5): 18–25. (in German).
Bennett D (1995). A Little Book of Monitor Lizards. London: Viper Press. 220 pp. .
Cogger HG (2014). Reptiles and Amphibians of Australia, Seventh Edition. Clayton, Victoria, Australia: CSIRO Publishing. xxx + 1,033 pp. .
Eidenmüller B (2007). "Small monitors in the terrarium". Reptilia (GB) (50): 12–19.
Eidenmüller B (2007). "Kleinwarane im Terrarium ". Reptilia (Münster) 12 (1): 16–23. (in German).
Hörenberg T, Koch A (2013). "Die Zwergwarane der Untergattung Odatria Gray, 1838 ". Draco 13 (53): 6–19. (in German).
Wilson S, Swan G (2013). A Complete Guide to Reptiles of Australia, Fourth Edition. Sydney: New Holland Publishers. 522 pp. .

Varanus
Monitor lizards of Australia
Reptiles described in 1987